Bungey is a surname. Notable people with the surname include:

Errol Bungey (born 1931), Australian bowls player
Mel Bungey (born 1934), Australian politician